Sir Michael Vincent Levey, LVO, FBA, FRSL (8 June 1927 – 28 December 2008) was a British art historian and was the director of the National Gallery from 1973 to 1986.

Biography

Levey was born in Wimbledon, London, and grew up in Leigh-on-Sea, Essex. He attended The Oratory School, a Catholic boarding school near Reading. He was called up for National Service in 1945 and served it largely in Egypt. After demobilisation in 1948 Levey went to Exeter College, Oxford to read English; he graduated with first class honours after only two years' study.

In 1951 Levey joined the National Gallery as assistant to the Keeper, Sir Martin Davies. He combined administrative duties with scholarly work, producing his first catalogue, on the Gallery's 18th-century Italian paintings, in 1956. In the 1960s, affordable art books with colour reproductions for the general reader began to appear, and Levey was commissioned to write an overview of Western painting for Thames & Hudson's World of Art series. The resulting book, A Concise History of Painting: From Giotto to Cézanne (1962), remains a classic overview of European art history from the introduction of perspective in Italy to the beginnings of modern art at the start of the 20th century.

From 1963 to 1964 Levey was Slade Professor of Fine Art at Cambridge University; his lectures were published as From Rococo to Revolution in 1966. The Early Renaissance, written a year later, is considered another milestone in popular art publishing, and was the first non-fiction work to win the Hawthornden Prize for Literature. Levey became deputy Keeper of the National Gallery in 1966, Keeper in 1968, and Director in 1973. He was knighted in 1981.

He relinquished his directorship to care for his wife, the novelist and critic Brigid Brophy, after she was diagnosed with multiple sclerosis in 1985; the disease ultimately claimed her life. Brophy and Levey were married in 1954 and had one daughter Kate Levey (b. 1957).

Levey was a Distinguished Supporter of the British Humanist Association.

His memoir, The Chapel is on Fire, recounts his upbringing and was published in 2000.

Selected publications
 The German School; National Gallery Catalogues, 1959, National Gallery, London
  Pictures in the Royal Collection, The Later Italian Pictures, 1964, Phaidon Press, London
 A Concise History of Painting: From Giotto to Cézanne, Thames & Hudson 'The World of Art Library' series.
 Painting at Court, 1971, Weidenfeld and Nicolson, London.
 Early Renaissance, 1967, Penguin
 The 17th and 18th century Italian Schools; National Gallery Catalogues, 1971, National Gallery, London, 
 The Life & Death of Mozart, 1971, Weidenfeld and Nicolson.
 From Rococo to Revolution: Major Trends in Eighteenth-Century Painting. Thames & Hudson 'The World of Art Library' series
 The Case of Walter Pater, 1978, Thames & Hudson.
 The National Gallery Collection, 1987, National Gallery Publications, 
 Painting and Sculpture in France, 1700-1789, Yale History of Art, 1993
 Florence, a Portrait, 1996, Jonathan Cape.

References

Further reading
 
 
 

Military personnel from London
20th-century British military personnel
Academics of the University of Cambridge
Slade Professors of Fine Art (University of Oxford)
Alumni of Exeter College, Oxford
British art historians
British curators
British humanists
British writers
Directors of the National Gallery, London
Fellows of the Royal Society of Literature
Knights Bachelor
Lieutenants of the Royal Victorian Order
1927 births
2008 deaths
People educated at The Oratory School
People from Leigh-on-Sea
People from Wimbledon, London
Fellows of the British Academy